Herbert Vivian "Viv" Randall (7 March 1914 – 7 September 1985) was an Australian rules footballer who played with Hawthorn in the Victorian Football League (VFL).

Family
His son, Trevor Randall, played with Hawthorn in 1960 and his granddaughter Pepa Randall plays for GWS Giants in the AFLW.

Football
Randall, a wingman, joined Hawthorn from Victorian Football Association (VFA) club Caulfield.

He had particularly strong seasons in 1935 and 1936 when he polled 10 and 12 votes respectively in the Brownlow Medal, finishing as Hawthorn's best vote getter on each occasion.

Randall made two appearances for Victoria at interstate football. He played against the Victorian Football Association in 1936 and South Australia the following year.

He played his last season for Hawthorn in 1938, then returned to the VFA, joining Camberwell.

Military service
During World War II, Randall served as a sapper in New Guinea.

Death
He died at the Repatriation General Hospital, in Heidelberg, Victoria, on 7 September 1985.

Honours and achievements
Individual
 Hawthorn life member

Notes

References

External links 
 
 
 Viv Randall's playing statistics from The VFA Project

1914 births
1985 deaths
Australian rules footballers from Melbourne
Caulfield Football Club players
Hawthorn Football Club players
Camberwell Football Club players
Australian military personnel of World War II
People from South Yarra, Victoria
Military personnel from Melbourne